The 2023 Eastern Michigan Eagles football team will represent Eastern Michigan University during the 2023 NCAA Division I FBS football season. The Eagles are led by tenth-year head coach Chris Creighton and play their home games at Rynearson Stadium in Ypsilanti, Michigan. They compete as members of the West Division of the Mid-American Conference (MAC).

Previous season

The Eagles finished the 2022 season 9–4 and 5–3 in the MAC to finish tied for first in the West Division.  They defeated San Jose State in the Famous Idaho Potato Bowl.

Schedule

References

Eastern Michigan
Eastern Michigan Eagles football seasons
Eastern Michigan Eagles football